Picrasma javanica is a tree in the family Simaroubaceae. The specific epithet  is from the Latin meaning "of Java".

Description
The bark is dark and smooth. The flowers are white to yellow or green.

Distribution and habitat
Picrasma javanica grows naturally from northeast India to Indochina and south to Malesia. Its habitat is rainforest from sea-level to  altitude.

References

javanica
Flora of tropical Asia